Kang Chengxun (808?-873?), courtesy name Jingci, formally the Duke of Fufeng, was a general of the Chinese Tang dynasty, most well known for his failures against Dali incursions but successes against the rebel Pang Xun (with the assistance of the Shatuo chieftain Zhuye Chixin).

Background 
Kang Chengxun might have been born in 808.  His grandfather was the general Kang Rizhi, who served under Emperor Dezong and carried the title of Prince of Kuaiji.  Kang Chengxun's father Kang Zhimu also served as an imperial general and carried the title of Duke of Kuaiji.

Because of his heritage, Kang Chengxun became a general in the imperial guards.  During the reign of Emperor Dezong's great-great-grandson Emperor Xuānzong, he was made the defender of the northern border base of Tiande (天德, in modern Bayan Nur, Inner Mongolia).  It was said that the army at Tiande lacked horses at that time and therefore was repeatedly suffering defeats when non-Han Chinese incursions occurred.  Kang reduced the budgets in areas that he felt were unnecessary in order to bolster the number of horses the base could afford, and it was said that after he did so, the Tiande army had more successes.  Dangxiang tribespeople had previously captured the nearby bases of Shediao and Luoyuan and taken captives, but when they heard of Kang's strengthening of the forces, they did not dare to attack Tiande and returned the previously captured people to Kang.  Kang was thus given an honorary ministerial title and created the Baron of Kuaiji.  He was thereafter made the military governor (Jiedushi) of Yiwu Circuit (義武, headquartered in modern Baoding, Hebei).

Campaign against Dali 
In 863, a major Dali attack against Tang's Annan District (安南, headquartered in modern Hanoi, Vietnam) captured Annan, and the Tang protector general for Annan, Cai Xi, died while fighting the Dali forces.  They then approached Yong Prefecture (邕州, in modern Nanning, Guangxi), the capital for Lingnan West Circuit.  The military governor of Lingnan West Circuit, Zheng Yu, who was a career civilian, was fearful of Dali forces and submitted a petition requesting to be replaced by a general.  Then-reigning Emperor Yizong (Emperor Xuānzong's son) recalled Kang to the capital Chang'an, intending to have him replace Zheng, and allowed him to bring several hundred officers and soldiers from Yiwu Circuit.  Upon Kang's arrival in Chang'an, Emperor Yizong commissioned him the military governor of Lingnan West, and also mobilized about 10,000 soldiers from Jingnan (荊南, headquartered in modern Jingzhou, Hubei), Shannan East (山南東道, headquartered in modern Xiangfan, Hubei), Eyue (鄂岳, headquartered in modern Wuhan, Hubei), and Jiangxi (江西, headquartered in modern Nanchang, Jiangxi) Circuits to accompany him to Lingnan West.

After Kang arrived at Yong Prefecture, the Dali attack was intensifying, so Emperor Yizong further mobilized troops from eight other circuits — Zhongwu (忠武, headquartered in modern Xuchang, Henan), Yicheng (義成, headquartered in modern Anyang, Henan), Pinglu (平盧, headquartered in modern Weifang, Shandong), Xuanwu (宣武, headquartered in modern Kaifeng, Henan), Yanhai (兗海, headquartered in modern Jining, Shandong), Tianping (天平, headquartered in modern Tai'an, Shandong), Xuanshe (宣歙, headquartered in modern Xuancheng, Anhui), and Zhenhai (鎮海, headquartered in modern Zhenjiang, Jiangsu) — to reinforce him.  Kang, however, did not set up a proper scouting system.  As Dali forces approached Yong Prefecture, Kang sent the troops from six circuits to engage them, using the local Liao tribesmen as guides; the Liao led the Tang forces into an ambush by Dali forces, and the troops of five circuits were annihilated, with only the Tianping forces, because they were late by one day, escaping the ambush.  In the aftermaths, Kang was gripped by fear, and the defenses for Yong Prefecture were actually built by his deputy Li Xingsu.  As soon as Li completed the defenses, Dali forces arrived and put Yong Prefecture after siege.

For four days, Yong Prefecture was under attack, and it almost fell.  A number of officers suggested counterattacking, but Kang initially refused, relenting only after repeated pleas by a low-level officer from Tianping.  At night, that Tianping officer took 300 volunteers and made a surprise attack on the Dali camp, setting it on fire and killing some 500 Dali soldiers.  In shock, the Dali forces withdrew.  Only then did Kang launch his main forces to try to chase down the Dali forces, but was unable to; they killed only some 300 Liao who were forced to cooperate with the Dali forces.  Kang nevertheless submitted a report claiming a great victory.  Emperor Yizong, in response, bestowed on Kang the honorific title of acting You Pushe.  However, all of the soldiers who received rewards based on Kang's report were Kang's relatives or soldiers close to him, and the soldiers who participated in the surprise raid were not awarded.  This brought much resentment.  Subsequently, the military governor of neighboring Lingnan East Circuit (嶺南東道, headquartered in modern Guangzhou, Guangdong), found out what happened, and reported this to the chancellors.  Kang himself was fearful as well that his deception would be discovered, so he claimed to be ill and offered to resign.  He was recalled to serve as a general of the imperial guards, but with his office at the eastern capital Luoyang.

Campaign against Pang Xun 
In 868, soldiers from Xusi Circuit (徐泗, headquartered in modern Xuzhou, Jiangsu) who had been sent to Lingnan West Circuit to defend against a potential Dali attack were incensed when they were informed that they were to stay another year at the border. They mutinied and headed toward Xusi's capital Xu Prefecture, under the leadership of the officer Pang Xun.  After defeating troops sent by the governor (觀察使, Guanchashi) Cui Yanzeng, Pang captured Xu Prefecture and put Cui under arrest.  He demanded official imperial sanction in taking over Xusi, threatening to attack the imperial capital Chang'an if Emperor Yizong refused.  Emperor Yizong reacted by commissioning Kang Chengxun as the military governor of Yicheng Circuit and the overall commander of the operation against Pang, while commissioning fellow imperial guard generals Wang Yanquan and Dai Keshi as the commanders of the northern and southern wings, respectively.  Kang requested his troops to be supplemented with the tribesmen under the Shatuo chief Zhuye Chixin, as well as the chieftains of Tuyuhun, Tatar, and Qibi tribes, and his request was approved.  As part of Kang's commission, Emperor Yizong also created him the Duke of Fufeng.

In winter 868, Kang arrived at Xinxing (新興, in modern Bozhou, Anhui), but at that time, he had only a little more than 10,000 men, and when Pang's follower Yao Zhou, who was then at nearby Liuzi (柳子, in modern Suzhou, Anhui), challenged him, he did not dare to engage Yao and withdrew to Song Prefecture (宋州, in modern Shangqiu, Henan).  Meanwhile, the rebels continued to expand their territory, largely unchecked.  By spring 869, however, Kang had gathered over 70,000 soldiers and stationed his army just west of Liuzi, and only then did the rebels begin to become fearful.  When one rebel commander who did not fear him, Wang Hongli, attacked him, he, together with Zhuye, defeated Wang, and it was said that starting from that point on, those in the rebel army who did not wholeheartedly support the rebel effort would surrender immediately upon engaging the imperial army.  Kang then attacked and captured Liuzi, causing Yao to flee, and Yao was subsequently killed by the fellow rebel commander Liang Pi.

Yao's death shocked and dismayed Pang, who, under the suggestion of his strategist Zhou Chong, tried to show resolve by officially declaring independence from the imperial government and killing Cui and his top staff members, as well as cutting off the limbs of the Huainan Circuit (淮南, headquartered in modern Yangzhou, Jiangsu) officer Li Xiang and the eunuch monitor Guo Houben and delivering them to Kang's army to try to strike terror into Kang's soldiers.  Pang subsequently launched a surprise attack on the Weibo Circuit (魏博, headquartered in modern Handan, Hebei), stationed to Xu Prefecture's north, and then turned west, ready to engage Kang.  He ordered the rebels to converge on Kang's army, but when Huainan soldiers that he had captured previously fled to Kang and informed Kang of the date that the rebels would attack, the rebel initiative was lost.  Kang crushed the rebels who arrived before Pang did, and then, when he engaged Pang, Pang's own forces, in fear, collapsed.  Kang captured a number of cities that had fallen into rebel control, and then headed to Su Prefecture (宿州, in modern Suzhou), which was then under the command of Pang's followers Zhang Ru and Zhang Shi.  Kang launched an initial siege on Su Prefecture but could not capture it quickly.  He, however, then persuaded the rebel officer Zhang Xuanren, who had not joined the rebellion willingly, into killing Zhang Ru and Zhang Shi and surrendering the city.  Zhang Xuanren then suggested to Kang that he pretend to be still leading a rebel army and use trickery — pretending that Su Prefecture had fallen and that he was fleeing — to capture the nearby rebel base of Fuli as well, and Zhang Xuanren's strategy succeeded, allowing the imperial forces to capture Fuli.

When Zhang Xuanren tried to use the same trickery to capture Xu Prefecture, which was then defended by Pang's father Pang Juzhi and ally Xu Ji (Pang Xun himself having left the city to try to launch a surprise attack on Song and Bo (亳州, in modern Bozhou) Prefectures), the rebels at Xu Prefecture realized what Zhang was up to and tried to defend against his attack.  Zhang, however, was able to persuade the populace to abandon the rebels in droves, and quickly, Xu Prefecture fell.  Meanwhile, Kang chased Pang, and Pang, after failing to capture Song Prefecture quickly, headed for Bo Prefecture.  Kang intercepted him there, and, in a final battle in which the Shatuo soldiers led the charge, crushed the remaining rebels.  Pang was killed in battle, and the rebellion was over.

After campaign against Pang Xun 
To reward Kang Chengxun for his contributions, Emperor Yizong commissioned him as the military governor of Hedong Circuit (河東, headquartered in modern Taiyuan, Shanxi) and gave him the honorary chancellor title of Tong Zhongshu Menxia Pingzhangshi.  However, in 870, the chancellors Lu Yan and Wei Baoheng (Emperor Yizong's son-in-law) submitted accusations that Kang was too tentative against Pang Xun, failed to wipe out all of the rebels, and was too anxious to seize the spoils of war.  As a result, Kang was demoted to be the teacher of Emperor Yizong's son Li Ji the Prince of Shu, but with his office at Luoyang.  Soon thereafter, he was further demoted to be the military advisor to the prefect of En Prefecture (恩州, in modern Jiangmen, Guangdong).

In 873, Emperor Yizong died.  His son Emperor Xizong recalled Kang to again serve as a general of the imperial guards.  Kang died soon thereafter.

Notes and references 

 New Book of Tang, vol. 148.
 Zizhi Tongjian, vols. 250, 251, 252.

873 deaths
Tang dynasty jiedushi of Yiwu Circuit
Tang dynasty jiedushi of Lingnan West Circuit
Tang dynasty jiedushi of Yicheng Circuit
Tang dynasty jiedushi of Hedong Circuit